The Chicago Cubs are a Major League Baseball franchise based in Chicago. They play in the National League Central division. Also known in their early years as the "Chicago White Stockings" (1876–1889), "Chicago Colts" (1890–1897), and "Chicago Orphans" (1898–1902), pitchers for the Cubs have thrown 17 no-hitters in franchise history. A no-hitter is officially recognized by Major League Baseball only "when a pitcher (or pitchers) allows no hits during the entire course of a game, which consists of at least nine innings". No-hitters of fewer than nine complete innings were previously recognized by the league as official; however, several rule alterations in 1991 changed the rule to its current form.

No Cubs pitcher has yet pitched a perfect game. The closest performance came on September 2, 1972, when Milt Pappas lost his perfect game bid against the San Diego Padres with two outs in the ninth by allowing a walk to Larry Stahl on a 3–2 count; he retired the next batter to finish the no-hitter. During that at-bat, he was ahead of the batter with a 0–2 count before throwing four straight close pitches to allow the walk.

Larry Corcoran threw the first no-hitter in Cubs history on August 19, 1880; the most recent no-hitter was thrown by Alec Mills on September 13, 2020. Two left-handed pitchers have thrown no-hitters in franchise history while ten were by right-handers. Corcoran, Arrieta, and Ken Holtzman are the only pitchers in Cubs history to throw more than one no-hitter. Corcoran threw three and Arrieta and Holtzman threw two.

On July 31, 1910, King Cole of the Cubs pitched all seven innings in a 4–0 win over the St. Louis Cardinals, without giving up a hit. The second game of a doubleheader, the teams had agreed to end the game at 5 p.m. so they could catch their trains. Due to a 1991 change to the official MLB definition of a no-hitter—it must last at least nine innings—Cole's effort is not recognized by as a no-hitter by MLB and does not appear on the below list.

Ten no-hitters were thrown at home, five were thrown on the road, and one was thrown at a neutral site. Two occurred in April, two in May, two in June, one in July, five in August, and four in September. A different umpire presided over each of the franchise's 17 no-hitters. Ten different managers led the team during the franchise's 17 no-hitters.

The longest interval between no-hitters was between the games pitched by Jimmy Lavender and Sam Jones, encompassing 39 years, 8 months, and 12 days from August 31, 1915, until May 12, 1955. The shortest interval in days between no-hitters was between the games pitched by Burt Hooton and Milt Pappas, encompassing four months and sixteen days from April 16, 1972, until September 2, 1972. The shortest interval in games between no-hitters was between the games pitched by Jake Arrieta on August 30, 2015, and April 21, 2016, 49 regular-season games. (The Cubs also played nine postseason games in October 2015, between these two no-hitters.)

Cubs pitchers have thrown two no-hitters against the Atlanta Braves and their predecessors – one by Corcoran in 1880 and one by Holtzman in 1969. They also threw two no-hitters against the Cincinnati Reds: Holtzman in 1971, Arrieta in 2016.

The Cubs have not allowed a run in any of their no-hitters. The most baserunners allowed in a no-hitter was eight in the Cubs' combined no-hitter in 2021. Of the seventeen no-hitters, four have been won by a score of 4–0, more than any other score. The largest margin of victory in a no-hitter (and the largest margin of victory in an MLB no-hitter since 1900) was a 16–0 win by Arrieta in 2016. The smallest margin of victory was a 1–0 win by Holtzman in 1971.

In the 1990 film Taking Care of Business, the no-hitters thrown by Burt Hooton and Milt Pappas during the 1972 season are the subject of a radio trivia contest that sets up the film's plot, which features the Cubs playing in the World Series.

List of no-hitters in Cubs history

See also
List of Major League Baseball no-hitters

References

No hitters
Chicago Cubs